Net promoter score (NPS) is a widely used market research metric that is based on a single survey question asking respondents to rate the likelihood that they would recommend a company, product, or a service to a friend or colleague. The NPS is a proprietary instrument developed by Fred Reichheld, who owns the registered NPS trademark in conjunction with Bain & Company and Satmetrix. Its popularity and broad use have been attributed to its simplicity and transparent methodology.

The NPS assumes a subdivision of respondents into "promoters" who provide ratings of 9 or 10, "passives" who provide ratings of 7 or 8, and "detractors" who provide ratings of 6 or lower. The net promoter score results from a calculation that involves subtracting the percentage of detractors from the percentage of promoters collected by the survey item. The result of the calculation is typically expressed as an integer rather than a percentage. The core How likely would you be to recommend... question is almost always accompanied by an open-ended "Why?" and sometimes by so-called "driver" questions. 

The NPS is typically interpreted and used as an indicator of customer loyalty. In some cases, it has been argued to correlate with revenue growth relative to competitors within an industry, although it has also been demonstrated that NPS scores vary substantially between industries. NPS has been widely adopted by Fortune 500 companies and other organizations. Proponents of the Net Promoter approach claim the score can be used to motivate an organization to become more focused on improving products and services. As of 2020, versions of the NPS are now used by two-thirds of Fortune 1000 companies.

Origins 
The origins of NPS date to a 2003 Harvard Business Review article by Reichheld entitled The One Number You Need To Grow.

Predicting customer loyalty 
The primary objective of the net promoter score methodology is to infer customer loyalty (as evidenced by repurchase and referral) to a product, service, brand, or company on the basis of respondents' responses to a single survey item. For some industries, in particular annuity-based business-to-business software and services, it has been shown that Detractors tend to remain with a company, while Passives are more likely to leave. The use of the NPS score in addition to revenue retention rates and customer retention rates may offer valuable customer insights and may offer a better predictibility of customer loyalty rates. 

As it represents responses to a single survey item, the validity and reliability of any corporation's NPS score ultimately depend on collecting a large number of ratings from individual human users. However, market research surveys are typically distributed by email, and response rates to such surveys have been declining steadily in recent years.   In the face of criticism of the net promoter score, the proponents of the net promoter approach claim that the "recommend" question is of similar predictive power to other metrics, but that it presents a number of practical benefits to other more complex metrics. Proponents also argue that analyses based on third-party data are inferior to those conducted by companies on their own customer sets, and that the practical benefits of the approach (including a short survey, a simple concept to communicate, and corporations' ability to follow up with customers) outweigh possible statistical inferiority to other metrics.

NPS scores definitionally range from -100 to +100.

Criticism 
While the net promoter score has gained popularity among business executives and is considered a widely used instrument for measuring customer loyalty in practice, it has also generated controversy in academic and market research circles. Scholarly critique has questioned whether the NPS is at all a reliable predictor of company growth. Other researchers have noted that there is no empirical evidence that the "likelihood to recommend" question is a better predictor of business growth than other customer-loyalty questions (e.g., overall satisfaction, likelihood to purchase again, etc.), and that the "likelihood to recommend" question does not measure anything different from other conventional loyalty-related questions.

See also
 Advocacy Index
 The Loyalty Effect
 Relationship marketing

References

External links
 Official site of The Ultimate Question 2.0 

Customer relationship management
Customer loyalty programs